Ivan Pavlovich Shipov (1865–1919) was an Imperial Russian politician. After graduating from the Imperial Alexander Lyceum, he entered the Ministry of Finance. He rose to the position of Assistant Director of the Special Credit Office, and was eventually Director of the General Office (Ministerial Chancellery).

In addition, he served on the Board of the State Bank in 1902–1905. In 1905, he was appointed Minister of Finance during the Witte government. In 1906, he left that position when Witte resigned, due in part to his long association with Witte.

The circumstances of Shipov's death are uncertain, but seem to coincide with many political arrests and executions by the Bolsheviks in 1919.

References
 Harcave, Sidney. (2004) Count Sergei Witte and the Twilight of Imperial Russia: A Biography. Armonk, New York: M.E. Sharpe.   
 Kokovtsov, Vladimir. (1935) Out of My Past (translator, Laura Matveev). Stanford: Stanford University Press.

1865 births
Government ministers of Russia
Members of the State Council (Russian Empire)
1919 deaths